Sahebpur is a census town within the jurisdiction of the Sonarpur police station in the Sonarpur CD block in the Baruipur subdivision of the South 24 Parganas district in the Indian state of West Bengal.

Geography

Area overview
Baruipur subdivision is a rural subdivision with moderate levels of urbanization. 31.05% of the population lives in the urban areas and 68.95% lives in the rural areas. In the northern portion of the subdivision (shown in the map alongside) there are 10 census towns. The entire district is situated in the Ganges Delta and the northern part of the subdivision is a flat plain bordering the metropolis of Kolkata.

Note: The map alongside presents some of the notable locations in the subdivision. All places marked in the map are linked in the larger full screen map.

Location

Kalikapur, Chak Baria and Sahebpur form a cluster of census towns in the Sonarpur CD block, as per the map of Sonarpur CD block in the District Census Handbook for the South 24 Parganas.

Demographics
According to the 2011 Census of India, Sahebpur had a total population of 7,109, of which 3,642 (51%) were males and 3,467 (49%) were females. There were 636 persons in the age range of 0 to 6 years. The total number of literate people in Sahebpur was 4,419 (79.47% of the population over 6 years).

Infrastructure
According to the District Census Handbook 2011, Sahebpur covered an area of 2.0573 km2. Kalikapur railway station is 2 km away. Among the civic amenities, the protected water supply involved overhead tank and service reservoir. It had 698 domestic electric connections. Among the educational facilities it had were 2 primary schools, the nearest middle school and the nearest secondary school at Jafarpur 1 km away, the nearest senior secondary school at Kalikapur 2 km away, the nearest general degree college at Ghoshpara, Sonarpur 3 km away. Among the important commodities it produced were tube light and lamp. It had the branch office of 1 nationalised bank.

Transport
A short stretch of local roads link Sahebpur to the Sonarpur-Chak Baria Road.

Kalikapur railway station is located nearby.

Education
Jafarpur Kalinath High School is a Bengali-medium coeducational school established in 1968. It has facilities for teaching from class 5 to class XII.

Healthcare
Sonarpur Rural Hospital, with 25 beds, at Rajpur Sonarpur, is the major government medical facility in the Sonarpur CD block.

References

Cities and towns in South 24 Parganas district
Neighbourhoods in Kolkata
Kolkata Metropolitan Area